Gregory Joseph Colbrunn (born July 26, 1969) is an American former Major League baseball player and hitting coach. Primarily a first baseman during his active career, the Fontana, California, native played in the Major Leagues for 13 seasons (1992–2004) and seven different teams. He served as the Boston Red Sox hitting coach during the 2013 and 2014 seasons.

Colbrunn graduated from Fontana High School and was selected by the Montreal Expos in the sixth round of the 1987 Major League Baseball draft, turning down a scholarship from Stanford University to begin his professional baseball career. Despite missing the entire 1991 season with an injury, he rose through the Montreal farm system and made his MLB debut with the Expos on July 9, 1992, and singled in his first at bat off Francisco Oliveras of the San Francisco Giants.

Playing career
After his debut with Montreal, Colbrunn would also play for the Florida Marlins, Minnesota Twins, Colorado Rockies, Atlanta Braves, Arizona Diamondbacks and Seattle Mariners. He hit for the cycle on September 18, 2002, against the San Diego Padres.

Colbrunn was part of the Diamondbacks' victorious 2001 World Series team, starting at first base in Game 6 and collecting two singles in five at bats, with a base on balls, two runs scored and one RBI, in Arizona's 15–2 thrashing of the New York Yankees.

In his 13-season MLB career, Colbrunn batted .289; his 801 career hits included 155 doubles, 12 triples and 98 homers.

Batting coach
After his playing career ended in 2005, Colbrunn became a coach in the Yankees' organization, serving as the hitting instructor for the Charleston RiverDogs of the Single-A South Atlantic League from 2007–09 and in 2011–12. In 2010, Colbrunn managed the RiverDogs to a 65–74 (.468) record.

Then, following the  season, Colbrunn joined the coaching staff of new Red Sox manager John Farrell as primary batting instructor. Under his guidance, the 2013 Red Sox led the Major Leagues in runs scored (853), runs per game (5.27), slugging percentage (.446), on-base percentage (.349), on-base plus slugging (.795), total bases (2,521) and extra-base hits (570).  The Red Sox won the American League East Division title, the American League pennant and the 2013 World Series.

On June 4, he was compelled to take a medical leave of absence after he suffered a cerebral hemorrhage during the Red Sox' road trip to Cleveland, Ohio, and was hospitalized in the Cleveland Clinic. He returned to his duties on a part-time basis on June 30. However, the 2014 Red Sox struggled offensively all season long, finishing at or near the bottom of the American League in almost every category, including runs scored (12th, with 634). After the 2014 season concluded, Colbrunn stepped down from his position with the Red Sox and declined another assignment within the organization.

Colbrunn, a resident of nearby Mount Pleasant, South Carolina, then returned to the Yankees' organization and the Charleston RiverDogs as their batting coach for 2015–16. In , the Yankees promoted him to roving minor league hitting coordinator, but he returned to being the hitting coach for the 2019 Charleston team,  in order to be closer to his family.

See also
 List of Major League Baseball players to hit for the cycle

References

External links

1969 births
Living people
American expatriate baseball players in Canada
Arizona Diamondbacks players
Atlanta Braves players
Baseball coaches from California
Baseball players from California
Boston Red Sox coaches
Brevard County Manatees players
Colorado Rockies players
Edmonton Trappers players
Everett AquaSox players
Florida Marlins players
Indianapolis Indians players
Jacksonville Expos players
Major League Baseball first basemen
Major League Baseball hitting coaches
Minnesota Twins players
Minor league baseball coaches
Minor league baseball managers
Montreal Expos players
Oklahoma RedHawks players
Ottawa Lynx players
Rockford Expos players
Seattle Mariners players
Sportspeople from Charleston, South Carolina
West Palm Beach Expos players
Tacoma Rainiers players
Tucson Sidewinders players